Bad Schönborn Süd station is the busier of two stations in the town of Bad Schönborn in the German state of  Baden-Württemberg. The other is Bad Schönborn-Kronau station. It is located on the Rhine Valley Railway in the district of Bad Langenbrücken. It is classified by Deutsche Bahn (DB) as a category 4 station. It has three platforms and is located in the area of the Karlsruher Verkehrsverbund (Karlsruhe Transport Association, KVV), which manages regional rail services and sets fares. Since December 2003, it has been exclusively served by services on lines S3 and S4 of the Rhine-Neckar S-Bahn.

History 

Langenbrücken station was built at the same time in Langenbrücken. A few years later, the line was doubled.

Since the broad gauge was incompatible with the standard gauge used by its neighbours, Baden soon feared the loss of lucrative through traffic. Therefore, Baden converted its lines to standard gauge in 1854 in just four months.

As on 1 January 1971, as part of the local government reform in Baden-Württemberg, Mingolsheim and Langenbrücken were incorporated in the newly formed municipality of Bad Schönborn and the station was renamed Bad Schönborn Süd.

The platforms were made accessible for the disabled in 2003, following the integration of the Rhine Valley Railway from Mannheim to Karlsruhe in the Rhine-Neckar S-Bahn network. The S-Bahn was opened for services at the 2003/2004 timetable change on 14 December 2003 and the station has been integrated in the S-Bahn network since.

Infrastructure

Platforms

Bad Schönborn Süd station is one of a few stations on the Rhine Valley Railway between Heidelberg and Bruchsal that has three tracks with a “home” platform next to the station building (platform 1) and an island platform (platforms 2 and 3). Trains towards Heidelberg stop at platform 1 and trains towards Bruchsal/Karlsruhe stop at platform 2. Track 3 is just a siding or used for the overtaking of slower trains.

Entrance building

In the entrance building of Bad Schoenborn Süd station is the so-called Kunstbahnhof ("Art Station"), occupied by an art school called ART-werk ("ART-works") and the studio of Förderkreises für Kunst und Kirche e. V. (support group for art and church).

Rail services 

Bad Schönborn Süd station is only served by S-Bahn services (as of  2014). The station is served hourly by services on S-Bahn lines S3 (Germersheim–Karlsruhe Hbf) and S4 (Germersheim–Bruchsal), resulting in a service every half-hour between Germersheim and Bruchsal.

Notes

References 

  (reprint Bad Schönborn 1974)

Railway stations in Baden-Württemberg
Rhine-Neckar S-Bahn stations
Railway stations in Germany opened in 1843
1843 establishments in Baden
Mannheim–Karlsruhe–Basel railway
Buildings and structures in Karlsruhe (district)